Saint George and the Dragon is a book written by Margaret Hodges and illustrated by Trina Schart Hyman. Released by Little, Brown, it was the recipient of the Caldecott Medal for illustration in 1985. The text is adapted from Edmund Spenser's epic poem The Faerie Queene.

Description 
Saint George and The Dragon is a small book measuring 9 x 0.1 x 10.1 inches, weighing 5.6 ounces, and is 32 pages long.

Plot 

This story begins with a nameless knight riding around the plain who has never been to battle. Despite this the Queene of Faeries sends him to fight a dragon who has been terrorizing their land. He travels with Una the princess of the land. On his way to the dragon the knight meets an old hermit on top of a hill who explains to him his English heritage and tells him his name is George. George meets the dragon lying down as if it was a hill itself. The dragon sees his sword and prepares for battle. The Dragon fells our hero twice, but each time he rises up stronger. After a hard-fought third battle George eventually emerges triumphant and slays the dragon. The king, promising Una to whoever slays the dragon, fulfills his promise and marries George and Una. Although all is well in the land George still fights other battles for the Queene of Faeries and through these battles George becomes Saint George.

Characters 
 George - Red cross knight hired by the queen of Faeries to defeat the dragon. 
 Queen of Faeries - Sends George to fight the dragon.
 Una - The Princess of the land who embarks on the mission with George.
 Hermit - Meets George on top of a hill and informs him that his name is George.
 Dragon - Monster who makes life hard for the people of the land until it gets slain by George.
 Queen - Una's mother.
 King - Promises his daughter Una to whoever slays the dragon.
 Donkey - Una rides alongside George on top of the donkey
 Dwarf - Tasked with carrying the food.

History 
The legend which was developed during the crusades is about George, a man who lived in 3rd century Rome in the area we call Libya today. George was an army commander during the persecution of Christianity under Roman emperor Diocletian. George refused to persecute Christians and was tortured and eventually beheaded. He became known as Saint George when Christian Roman Emperor Constantine devoted a church to him.

Themes 
Revelation 12:9 in the Bible describes a great dragon who managed to deceive the whole world and was cast out. The dragon in the story symbolizes the Devil and how the power of Christ is what was necessary to put it away once and for all. In the story, George comes across a town of pagans who have been giving offerings to the dragon. He slays the dragon and the people of the town abandon their paganism and adopt Christianity. The Red Cross on his armor is meant to invoke Biblical symbolism in the mind of the readers.

Critical reception 
Goodreads.com calls Saint George and the Dragon "the perfect way to introduce a classic tale to a whole new generation of readers." Steve Barancik of "The Best Children's Books" says "St. George appears scratched. The dragon loses some bloody appendages. Thus, make your own decisions about sharing the book with younger children." The Catholic Information Center calls Saint George and the Dragon "truly marvelous and appropriate for girls and boys of all ages." "The Illustrations are worth the admission alone." This adaptation of The Faerie Queen features illustrations that "glitter with color and mesmerizing details," said PW. Kirkus Reviews calls Saint George and the Dragon "a strong narrative, with stagy decor and pictures." In a retrospective essay about the Caldecott Medal-winning books from 1976 to 1985, Barbara Bader described Saint George and the Dragon as "a pretentious invocation of past illustrational glories, which it cheapens rather than enhances: the definition of kitsch."

References 

1984 children's books
American picture books
Caldecott Medal–winning works
Children's fiction books
Little, Brown and Company books
Works based on The Faerie Queene
Saint George and the Dragon